No Name Key is an island in the lower Florida Keys in the United States. It is accessible by a concrete bridge from Big Pine Key and was the terminus of a car ferry that existed before the present Overseas Highway was built on the remains of Flagler's Overseas Railroad.

Electricity
No Name Key was known for not being connected to the commercial power grid, for a local county ordinance prohibited this. Residents mostly used a combination of solar energy and diesel or gas generators.

This prohibition of commercial electricity sparked a lawsuit between Monroe County and the No Name Key property owners. In May 2013, the Florida Public Service Commission exercised its jurisdiction over public utilities and issued Order PSC-13-0207-PAA-EM declaring the residents had a right to commercial electrical power. A week later, the circuit court issued a writ of mandamus ordering the county to issue the permits necessary to connect the residential homes to the commercial electric grid.

On May 29, 2013, the decades-long battle over electricity ended as the residents began connecting to the commercial electric grid.

Flora and fauna
Native fauna of No Name Key include the endangered Key deer.

References

External links
History of No Name Key
History of Big Pine Key

Islands of the Florida Keys
Islands of Monroe County, Florida
Islands of Florida